Edgewood / Candler Park is a train station in Atlanta, Georgia, on the Blue Line of the Metropolitan Atlanta Rapid Transit Authority (MARTA) rail system. Currently, the station also serves as the terminus of the Green Line on weekdays. On weekends, Green Line service instead terminates two stops to the west at King Memorial. The station opened on June 30, 1979.

This station was proposed to be the final connecting point between the Eastbound Train (now known as Blue Line) and Proctor Creek Lines (now Green Line) before it shifted toward North Central DeKalb. Two stations for that area were planned: Emory and Druid Hills, respectively, before they were ultimately canceled. An additional station was planned on the Green Line to end at Perry Homes on the Western side, but ultimately, only Bankhead was built. The station was built to handle the separation of the rail lines and to handle people transferring between trains.

It mainly serves the communities of Edgewood, Kirkwood, and Candler Park. Bus service is provided to Villages of East Lake, Edgewood Retail District, Ponce City Market, Little Five Points and Downtown Kirkwood

Station layout

Bus routes at this station
The station is served by the following MARTA bus routes:

South Bus Bays
 Route 24 - McAfee / Hosea Williams Drive
 Route 102 - North Avenue / Little Five Points

Nearby landmarks & destinations
Candler Park neighborhood
Edgewood neighborhood

References

External links 

MARTA Station Page
nycsubway.org Atlanta page
 DeKalb Avenue entrance from Google Maps Street View

Blue Line (MARTA)
Green Line (MARTA)
Metropolitan Atlanta Rapid Transit Authority stations
Railway stations in DeKalb County, Georgia
Railway stations in the United States opened in 1979
Railway stations in Atlanta
1979 establishments in Georgia (U.S. state)